The Montana Senate is the upper house of the Montana Legislature, the state legislative branch of the U.S. state of Montana. The body is composed of 50 senators elected for four years.

Composition of the Senate
68th Legislature – 2023–2024

Leaders
The leaders of the Montana Senate include:

Members of the Montana Senate

Montana limits its State Senators to two four-year terms (8 years) in any 16-year period.

Past composition of the Senate

See also
Montana Legislature
Montana House of Representatives

References

External links

 Montana State Legislature
 Leadership of the 60th Montana Legislature
State Senate of Montana from Project Vote Smart

 
State upper houses in the United States